Wing and a Prayer Fife and Drum Corps was an American disco group in existence from 1975 to 1978. The assemblage of studio musicians (which, contrary to its name, had no fife players) were put together by Harold Wheeler; the group's vocalists were Linda November, Vivian Cherry, Arlene Martell, and Helen Miles.

Their 1976 album, Babyface, hit No. 47 on the US pop album chart and No. 19 on the R&B Albums chart, due to the success of the single, "Baby Face". It had previously reached No. 1 for Jan Garber in 1926 and Art Mooney in 1948. The single went to No. 1 on the US Club Play chart, No. 6 AC, No. 32 US Billboard R&B Singles, and No. 14 on the Billboard Hot 100. The single also reached No. 12 in the UK Singles Chart and number 57 in Australia.

Discography

Studio albums

References

External links
 

American disco groups
American dance music groups